is a junction passenger railway station in the city of  Kisarazu, Chiba Prefecture, Japan, operated by the East Japan Railway Company (JR East).

Lines
Kisarazu Station is served by the Uchibō Line and Kururi Line. It is 31.3 kilometers from the starting point of the Uchibō Line at Soga Station and forms the eastern terminus of the 32.3 kilometer Kururi Line.

Station layout

The station consists of two island platforms serving four tracks, connected to the station building by a footbridge. The station has a "Midori no Madoguchi" staffed ticket office.

Platforms

History

Kisarazu Station opened on August 21, 1912. The station was absorbed into the JR East network upon the privatization of JNR on April 1, 1987.

Bus terminals

Highway buses 
 For Narita International Airport
 For Haneda Airport
 For Tokyo Station
 For Shinjuku Station
 For Shinagawa Station
 For Kawasaki Station
 For Yokohama Station

Passenger statistics
In fiscal 2019, the station was used by an average of 13,529 passengers daily (boarding passengers only).

Surrounding area
 
 Kisarazu City Hall
 Kisarazu Port

See also
 List of railway stations in Japan

References

External links

 JR East Station information  

Railway stations in Chiba Prefecture
Kururi Line
Uchibō Line
Stations of East Japan Railway Company
Railway stations in Japan opened in 1912
Kisarazu